Takydromus wolteri, also known commonly as the mountain grass lizard, is a species of lizard in the family Lacertidae. The species is native to East Asia.

Etymology
The specific name, wolteri, is in honor of German amateur naturalist Karl Andreas Wolter, who collected the holotype.

Geographic range
T. wolteri is found in eastern China, Korea, and eastern Russia.

Reproduction
T. wolteri is oviparous.

References

Further reading
Arnold EN (1997). "Interrelationships and evolution of the East Asian grass lizards, Takydromus (Squamata: Lacertidae)". Zoological Journal of the Linnean Society 119 (2): 267–296.
Fischer JG (1885). "Ichthyologische und herpetologische Bemerkungen. V. Herpetologische Bemerkungen ". Jahrbuch der Hamburgischen Wissenschaftlichen Anstalten 2: 82–121. (Takydromus wolteri, new species, pp. 82–85). (in German).
Ma L, Liu P, Su S, Luo L-G, Zhao W-G, Ji X (2019). "Life-history consequences of local adaptation in lizards: Takydromus wolteri (Lacertidae) as a model organism". Biological Journal of the Linnean Society 127 (1): 88–99.
Yu D-N, Ji X (2012). "The complete mitochondrial genome of Takydromus wolteri (Squamata: Lacertidae)". Mitochondrial DNA 24 (1): 3–5.

Takydromus
Reptiles described in 1885
Taxa named by Johann Gustav Fischer
Reptiles of China
Reptiles of Korea
Reptiles of Russia